Castellbell i el Vilar (Castellbell y Vilar in Spanish) is a municipality in the comarca of the Bages in Catalonia, Spain. It is situated at the point where the Llobregat river crosses the Prelittoral Range. 
The railway station serves both the FGC line R5 between Barcelona and Manresa and the Renfe line between Barcelona and Zaragoza. The C-1411 road links the municipality with Martorell and Manresa.

Castellbell i el Vilar is known for its cotton industry, although agriculture is at least as important to the local economy. Castellbell castle (gothic, fourteenth century) was one of the two main points (along with Claramunt castle) controlling access to the lower Llobregat valley, and hence to Barcelona. The bridge over the Llobregat also dates from the fourteenth century.

Demography

References

 Panareda Clopés, Josep Maria; Rios Calvet, Jaume; Rabella Vives, Josep Maria (1989). Guia de Catalunya, Barcelona: Caixa de Catalunya.  (Spanish).  (Catalan).

External links

 Official website 
 Government data pages 

Municipalities in Bages
Populated places in Bages